The 1976 Davis Cup was the 65th edition of the Davis Cup, the most important tournament between national teams in men's tennis. 58 teams would enter the competition, 32 in the Europe Zone, 14 in the Americas Zone, and 12 in the Eastern Zone. This year's tournament saw all teams in the Americas Zone competing in one single bracket, with the previous North & Central America and South America sub-zones, and subsequently the Americas Inter-Zonal final, being eliminated. This brought the Americas Zone in line with the outline of the other zones, with the previous year's Americas sub-zone champions progressing to the new Americas main draw semifinals.

Chile defeated South Africa in the Americas Zone final, Australia defeated New Zealand in the Eastern Zone final, and the Soviet Union and Italy were the winners of the two Europe Zones, defeating Hungary and Great Britain, respectively.

In the Inter-Zonal Zone, Italy defeated Australia in their  semifinal; the second semifinal was scratched and Chile advanced to the Final as the Soviet Union refused to travel to Chile due to their opposition to the military dictatorship of Augusto Pinochet. In the final, held in the Estadio Nacional in Santiago, Chile, on 17–19 December, Italy defeated Chile to win their first title and become the seventh nation to win the Davis Cup.

Americas Zone

Preliminary rounds

Main Draw

Final
Chile vs. South Africa

Eastern Zone

Preliminary rounds

Main Draw

Final
Australia vs. New Zealand

Europe Zone

Zone A

Pre-qualifying round

Preliminary rounds

Main Draw

Final
Soviet Union vs. Hungary

Zone B

Pre-qualifying rounds

Preliminary rounds

Main Draw

Final
Great Britain vs. Italy

Inter-Zonal Zone

Draw

Semifinals
Italy vs. Australia

Chile vs. Soviet Union

The tie was scheduled to be completed by September 27, but the Soviet Union refused to travel to Chile due to their opposition to the military dictatorship of Augusto Pinochet: therefore, the tie was scratched and Chile advanced to the Final. The Soviet team were subsequently banned from entering the Davis Cup for two years.

Final
Chile vs. Italy

References

External links
Davis Cup Official Website

 
Davis Cups by year
Davis Cup
Davis Cup
Davis Cup
Davis Cup
Davis Cup
Davis Cup